A Gentlemen's Race  is a type of unsanctioned, unmarshalled road ride established in the Pacific Northwest region of the United States in 2008. Inspired by the sort of riding of the Rapha Continental  project, with a notion of Classic cycle races, a penchant for gravel and an appreciation of the small communities, people and places in outlying areas, the Gentlemen's Race was meant to push the boundaries typical of Bicycle racing.

Taking cues from the famous running relay race Hood-to-Coast, where teams of 12 runners work together to race  from Mount Hood to the Pacific Ocean, the Gentlemen's Race was first run around the northern base of Mt. Hood back to Portland  with two checkpoints along the way to ensure fair play and safety.

Using a proprietary ranking and handicap system, teams of six riders depart with those estimated to be slowest first and the fastest departing last. Part Team time trial, part Alleycat races, part Cannonball Run, the teams must work and stay together the entire race. That factor above anything else is a great leveler for the race.

References

External links 
Gentlemen's Race East Coast 
Gentlemen's Race Mt. Hood 
Hudson Valley Randonneur 
MWI Gentlemen's Race 
Love the Pain 

Cycle racing in the United States